TweetDeck is a social media dashboard application for management of Twitter accounts. Originally an independent app, TweetDeck was subsequently acquired by Twitter Inc. and integrated into Twitter's interface. It has long ranked as one of the most popular Twitter clients by percentage of tweets posted, alongside the official Twitter web client and the official apps for iPhone and Android.

Like other Twitter applications, it interfaces with the Twitter API to allow users to send and receive tweets and view profiles.

It can be used as a web app. Until 2015 it could also be used as a Chrome app and until 2022 it could also be used as a MacOS app. Users are now redirected to the web app.

User interface 
TweetDeck consists of a series of customisable columns, which can be set up to display the user's Twitter timeline, mentions, direct messages, lists, trends, favorites, search results, hashtags, or all tweets by or to a single user. It is similar to Twitter's "Dashboard App" that was discontinued in 2016. The client uses Twitter's own automatic and invisible URL shortening whereby a link of any length will only use 23 characters of a Tweet's 280-character limit. All columns can be filtered to include or exclude words or tweets from users. Tweets can be sent immediately or scheduled for later delivery.

Users can monitor multiple accounts simultaneously. For added account security, users signing in with their Twitter username and password can use Twitter's own two-step verification.

As of May 2015, TweetDeck added a "confirmation step" feature, giving users the option to require an extra step before sending a tweet. A February 2018 change to the Twitter API restricted the ability of TweetDeck and other third-party applications from sending mass tweets due to concerns over abuse of bots mass posting content and posts. The change also restricts ability of using multiple accounts via the API.

In July 2021, Twitter announced the beta launch of an overhaul for TweetDeck. The new version will have a different visual look and will incorporate more functionality from the main Twitter website. A company representative said the beta includes "a full Tweet Composer, new advanced search features, new column types, and a new way to group columns into clean workspaces".

Product history 
July 4, 2008 – first version of TweetDeck, originally an independent Twitter app by Iain Dodsworth, was released.

June 19, 2009 – iPhone version released.

May 2010 – iPad version released.

October 2010 – Android version made available after a public beta period.

May 25, 2011 – Twitter acquired TweetDeck.

September 15, 2011 – TweetDeck tweeted that new updates for all versions would be released and that "As part of the process of making TweetDeck more consistent with Twitter.com & Twitter's mobile apps, we're removing deck.ly from our apps." Many users expressed their anger at this feature removal in the comments on the iOS and Android Market. Deck.ly previously allowed users to post tweets in excess of 140 characters.

December 8, 2011 – Twitter released a new version branded "TweetDeck by Twitter", as part of Twitter's redesign of its services. TweetDeck changed from an Adobe AIR application to a native Windows and Mac OS X application in this release, introducing a web version of TweetDeck for WebKit-based browsers based on TweetDeck's existing Google Chrome app. The update dropped support for LinkedIn, Google Buzz, Foursquare, MySpace accounts.

March 4, 2013 – TweetDeck announced in a blog post that they would be suspending mobile versions of TweetDeck including TweetDeck AIR, TweetDeck for iPhone and TweetDeck for Android, which were removed from their respective app stores in May. TweetDeck said they would "focus our development efforts on our modern, web-based versions".

May 2013 – Users were informed that 'Facebook is no longer supported in TweetDeck', and Facebook accounts and Facebook columns would be removed on May 7. All unofficial variants of TweetDeck stopped working in early May 2013 because of more restrictive API version 1.1.

July 25, 2013 – at 12:00 PM EDT US, Twitter turned off API v1 which effectively shut down the Android, iOS, and AIR versions of TweetDeck.

December 11, 2013 – Twitter began allowing new TweetDeck users to sign in with their Twitter usernames and passwords, removing the previous barrier-to-entry requiring users to register a separate TweetDeck account. In a blog post, Twitter said "When single sign in is fully available to all current users, we'll also make it possible to seamlessly integrate your current TweetDeck settings and preferences".

June 11, 2014 – A cross-site scripting vulnerability in TweetDeck was discovered, leading to a self-replicating tweet that affected over 83,000 Twitter users.

April 15, 2016 – The Windows App ceased functioning on April 15, 2016.

July 1, 2022 - The MacOS app  stopped functioning, with users being directed to the TweetDeck web-site instead.

Integration with other social networking services 
Originally, as it is now, TweetDeck was aimed towards the Twitter social networking service. Over the years, TweetDeck introduced support for other social networks, but has since removed that support.

On March 16, 2009, a pre-release version was released featuring Facebook status updates integration. As of April 8, 2009, Facebook status updates were part of the standard program. From version 0.30 TweetDeck also supported MySpace integration. Version 0.32, released on November 30, 2009, added LinkedIn integration and new Twitter features. In May 2010 TweetDeck also added integration with the Google Buzz and Foursquare social networks.

In 2012 TweetDeck reverted to only supporting Twitter and Facebook, ending support for LinkedIn, MySpace, and the now defunct Google Buzz effective June 2012.

In May 2013, TweetDeck removed support for Facebook accounts.

TweetDeck Ltd (company) 
A year after launching TweetDeck in 2008, Iain Dodsworth received his initial $300,000 seed funding from The Accelerator Group, Howard Lindzon, Taavet Hinrikus, Gerry Campbell, Roger Ehrenberg, betaworks, Brian Pokorny, and Bill Tai. The company raised a Series A round of funding with many of these same investors, and Ron Conway, Danny Rimer, and the SV Angel group.

On May 25, 2011, TweetDeck was bought by Twitter for £25 million, after a bidding war with Bill Gross's UberMedia.

On January 22, 2013, The American directors of Twitter were sent a letter by Companies House (the United Kingdom Registrar of Companies) warning them that their UK subsidiary company TweetDeck Ltd. was at risk of closure, over missed accounting deadlines. This had no bearing on the product or service which was by then run by Twitter, not by TweetDeck Ltd, which was officially struck off the business register by Companies House, and dissolved, for failure to file accounts for 2011.

References

External links 

Twitter services and applications
Cross-platform software
Google Chrome extensions
Twitter, Inc. acquisitions
2008 software
2011 mergers and acquisitions
Shorty Award winners